Trouble No More is American singer-songwriter and musician John Mellencamp's 18th studio album and his final recording for Columbia Records, released in 2003. It consists of blues and folk covers.

A re-working of "To Washington" featuring new lyrics critical of President George W. Bush and the Iraq War, generated much controversy upon the album's release.

In addition to the album, a documentary titled Trouble No More: The Making of a John Mellencamp Album was produced and directed by Ron Osgood, along with students from his documentary course at Indiana University. The documentary won a Regional Emmy and several small festival awards in 2004 and 2005.

Track listing
 "Stones in My Passway" (Robert Johnson) – 3:17
 "Death Letter" (Son House) – 6:14
 "Johnny Hart" (Woody Guthrie) – 4:31
 "Baltimore Oriole" (Hoagy Carmichael, Paul Francis Webster) – 3:54
 "Teardrops Will Fall" (Dicky Doo, Marion Smith) – 4:24
 "Diamond Joe" (Traditional; new lyrics by Mellencamp) – 4:37
 "The End of the World" (Sylvia Dee, Arthur Kent) – 3:24
 "Down in the Bottom" (Willie Dixon) – 3:31
 "Lafayette" (Lucinda Williams) – 3:55
 "Joliet Bound" (Kansas Joe McCoy, Memphis Minnie) – 3:34
 "John the Revelator" (Traditional) – 3:19
 "To Washington" (Traditional; new lyrics by Mellencamp) – 2:39

Personnel

Musicians
John Mellencamp – vocals, guitar
Andy York – guitars, bass
Dane Clark – drums, percussion
Miriam Sturm – violin, viola
Michael Ramos – accordion, organ
Toby Myers – upright bass
John Gunnell – electric bass
Pat Peterson – background vocals, tambourine
Courtney Kaiser – background vocals, tambourine
Heather Headley – background vocals
Janas Hoyt – background vocals
Michael Clark – pedal steel
T. Blayde – kazoo

DVD
Producer and Director: Ron Osgood
Associate Producer: Will Deloney
Assistant Directors: Matt Bockelman, Brian Rogat
Head Writer: Chris Booker
Senior Photographer: Ron Prickel
Location Sound: Stuart Notion
Graphics and Effects: Abbie Harmon, Scott Carmichael
Post-Production Sound: Charlie Hoyt
Special Thanks: Indiana University
Booklet Photos: Elaine Mellencamp
Design: Design Monsters
Management: Hoffman Entertainment

Charts

Album – Billboard (United States)

References

External links 
Review from No Depression
Review from PopMatters 
Review from Creem
Review from USA Today

John Mellencamp albums
2003 albums
Columbia Records albums
Covers albums